"Going Away to College" is a song by American rock band Blink-182 from the band's third studio album, Enema of the State (1999). It examines themes of heartbreak and lovesickness. It was written primarily by bassist Mark Hoppus, and credited to both he and guitarist Tom DeLonge. Hoppus writes from the perspective of an adolescent boyfriend, young and in love. He wrote the song remembering how graduating high school can cause relationships to fracture, as both individuals move on to attend separate universities. It was inspired by the teen movie Can't Hardly Wait (1998).

Music reviewers generally were positive regarding the song, and it has often been placed in rankings of the band's best songs.

Background

Blink-182 formed in 1992 in San Diego, California. The band's principal songwriting team—guitarist Tom DeLonge and bassist Mark Hoppus—frequently wrote fast-paced, often autobiographical pop punk songs dealing with age, maturity, and most prominently, relationships. The band grew successful throughout the decade with independent albums and constant touring, attracting a following at the peak of punk rock's mainstream popularity.

"Going Away to College" was among the last songs the band developed for Enema of the State. It was written primarily by bassist Mark Hoppus, and credited to both he and guitarist Tom DeLonge. Drummer Travis Barker receives no songwriting credit, as he was considered a touring musician at this point in their career. Despite this, he served as the song's arranger, "selecting the tempos and organizing the flow of verses, choruses, and breaks." Producer Jerry Finn prepared for the sessions by attending one of the band's concerts in Las Vegas, where he polled audience members on what song topics they most enjoyed. Many concertgoers, particularly women, spoke positively about Hoppus's tunes focusing on heartbreak. Finn asked Hoppus to write another break-up song, and claimed that Hoppus returned the following day with "Going Away to College".

The song was inspired by the film Can't Hardly Wait, a teen movie that centers on a group of high school students graduating and "facing an uncertain future." The film, released the prior year, had featured Blink's music on its soundtrack. Though he had seen it twice, Hoppus viewed it a third time while at home sick on Valentine's Day 1999. The film's plot line led him to think about "how much it sucks when people are in love in high school" and are forced to be separated after graduation by different colleges in different cities. He reportedly wrote the song in ten minutes and scribbled its lyrics on a napkin. As the bulk of the album's percussion was recorded at the beginning of the process in Los Angeles, the band had to go back to record the song's drum tracks. The drums were recorded at the home studio of jazz keyboardist Chick Corea, called Mad Hatter Studios.

Composition

The song explores the concept of lovesickness. In the song, Hoppus writes from the perspective of an adolescent boyfriend, grappling with the reality that his relationship may change upon graduating from high school. He sings of skipping a lecture to watch his significant other play soccer. In one subsequent lyric, he anxiously asks, "Is my picture still hanging in her locker?" The song's chorus finds Hoppus declaring his love over a "bouquet of clumsy words / a simple melody." Altogether, Hoppus pleads with his lover to "don't forget to think about me / And I won't forget you." Randall Colburn, writing for online publication Consequence of Sound, observes that Hoppus switches between "romantic immediacy and indifference; sometimes he's singing directly to his girlfriend, and sometimes she exists only in the past tense."

According to sheet music published at Musicnotes.com by Kobalt Music Publishing America, "Going Away to College" is written in common time with a tempo of 210 beats per minute. Set in the key of B major, it follows the chord progression of B–Bsus2–B–Bsus2 for the intro, a series of B–E5–F5 in the verses, and D5–E5–B5–F5 progression for the choruses. Hoppus and DeLonge's vocal parts span from A4 to F5. The song boasts a "chugging, stop-start verses and hooky chorus." CNN reporter Donna Freydkin referred to it as a "bittersweet ditty about young love." Writer Jeff Yerger, for Stereogum, likened its contents to "Valentine cards you'd send to your crush, or wistful notes you'd write in someone’s yearbook."

Reception
"Going Away to College" debuted as part of a medley of songs with 30-second snippets available to stream on a2b music, an early digital music service owned by AT&T. It was officially released as a part of Enema of the State on June 1, 1999.

The song has received acclaim, and has been considered among the band's best moments. Ann Powers, in her review for The New York Times, interpreted the track as a "portrait of the male psyche as a slapdash work in progress." Kyle McGovern of Spin selected it as among the set's "many highlights". Veteran music journalist and essayist Robert Christgau noted the band's lineage when he called it as "the love song the Descendents put Green Day on earth to inspire." Billboard contributor Chris Payne said it "captures the glory days of Blink." An uncredited Alternative Press writer called it a "tender moment of youthful vulnerability," in contrast with the brattiness found elsewhere on the record. Consequence of Sound placed it at number two in a 2015 ranking of the band's best songs, with the writer Randall Colburn extolling it as a "perfect" summation of "puppy love": "It's the sound of two people growing apart: the widening gulf, moments of renewed connection, the eventual drift [...] that's usually how it goes in real life, right?" A Rolling Stone reader's poll placed the song at number eight on a top-ten ranking of the band's best.

A live rendition of the song was included on the band's 2000 album The Mark, Tom, and Travis Show (The Enema Strikes Back!). In the recording, Hoppus substitutes the lyric "But you're so beautiful to me" with "But you're so beautiful, Skye Leigh," a reference to his wife, Skye Everly. The Welsh indie rock group Los Campesinos! covered the song in 2014 at several live shows, and in a session for satellite radio station SiriusXMU. In a 2020 Nylon piece, drummer Chuck Comeau of Simple Plan singled out "College" among the pop-punk songs he wished he had written, confessing, "that song was so poignant and powerful to me."

Personnel
Adapted from Enema of the State liner notes.

Blink-182
 Mark Hoppus – bass guitar, vocals
 Tom DeLonge – guitars, vocals
 Travis Barker – drums, percussion

Production
 Jerry Finn – production
 Tom Lord-Alge – mixing engineer
 Sean O'Dwyer – recording engineer
 Darrel Harvey – assistant engineer
 John Nelson – assistant engineer
 Robert Read – assistant engineer
 Mike Fasano – drum technician
 Brian Gardner – mastering engineer

Notes

References 

Blink-182 songs
1999 songs
Songs written by Mark Hoppus
Songs written by Tom DeLonge